The Daily Planet is a fictional newspaper appearing in American comic books published by DC Comics, commonly in association with Superman. The newspaper was first mentioned in Action Comics #23 (April 1940). The Daily Planet building's distinguishing feature is the enormous globe that sits on top of the building.

Based in the fictional city of Metropolis, the paper employs Clark Kent, Lois Lane, Jimmy Olsen, and Perry White as its editor-in-chief. The building's original features were inspired  by the Old Toronto Star Building where Superman's co-creator, Joe Shuster, was a newsboy when the Toronto Star was still called the Daily Star. Shuster has claimed that Metropolis was visually inspired by Toronto. Over the years, however, Metropolis has come to serve as an analogue to New York City.

Fictional history

Golden and Silver Age

When Superman first appeared in comics (specifically 1938's Action Comics #1), his alter ego Clark Kent worked for a newspaper named the Daily Star, under editor George Taylor. Joe Shuster named the Daily Star after the Toronto Daily Star newspaper in Toronto, Ontario, which had been the newspaper that Shuster's parents received and for which Shuster had worked as a newsboy. It was not until later years that the fictional paper became the Daily Planet. (The real-world newspaper was called the Evening Star prior to 1899; the Toronto Daily Star is now known as the Toronto Star.)

While choosing a name for the fictitious newspaper, consideration was given to combining the names of The Globe and Mail (another Toronto newspaper) and the Daily Star to become The Daily Globe. But when the comic strip appeared, the newspaper's name was permanently made the Daily Planet to avoid a name conflict with real newspapers. In Superman #5 (Summer 1940), the publisher of the Daily Planet is shown to be Burt Mason, a man who is determined to print the truth even when corrupt politician Alex Evell threatens him. In Superman #6 (September–October 1940), Mason gives free printing equipment to The Gateston Gazette after its editor, Jim Tirrell, is killed and its equipment is destroyed by racketeers that Tirrell insisted on reporting.

When DC made use of its multiverse means of continuity tracking between the early 1960s and mid-1980s, it was declared that the Daily Star was the newspaper's name in the Golden Age or "Earth-Two" versions of Clark Kent, Lois Lane and Jimmy Olsen, while the Daily Planet was used in the Silver Age or "Earth-One" versions. The Clark Kent of Earth-Two eventually became the editor-in-chief of the Daily Star, something his Earth-One counterpart did not achieve.

In the Silver and Bronze Age universes, Clark's first contact with the Daily Planet came when reporter (and future editor) Perry White came to Smallville to write a story about Superboy, and wound up getting an interview where the Boy of Steel first revealed his extraterrestrial origins. The story resulted in Perry earning a Pulitzer Prize. During Clark Kent's years in college, Perry White was promoted to editor-in-chief upon the retirement of the Daily Planets previous editor, the Earth-One version of George Taylor.

After graduating from Metropolis University with a degree in journalism, Clark Kent went to work at the Planet, and quickly met Lois Lane (who had been working there for some time already).Superman #133 (November 1959) After Clark was hired, Jimmy Olsen joined the paper's staff.

In 1971, the Daily Planet was purchased by Morgan Edge, president of the Galaxy Broadcasting System. Edge proceeded to integrate Metropolis television station WGBS-TV's studios into the Daily Planet building, and named Clark Kent as the anchor for the WGBS evening news. Eventually, Clark's former schoolmate from Smallville Lana Lang joined Clark as a co-anchor.

After the 1985–1986 miniseries Crisis on Infinite Earths, many of these elements, including Morgan Edge buying the Daily Planet, were retroactively changed or eliminated from the Superman canon.

Post-Crisis
In the post-Crisis comics' canon, years before Clark or Lois began working for the paper, Lex Luthor owned the Daily Planet. When Luthor, deciding to sell the paper, began taking bids for the Planet, Perry White convinced an international conglomerate, TransNational Enterprises, to buy the paper. They agreed to this venture with only one stipulation: that Perry White would become editor-in-chief. White had served as the Planet editor-in-chief ever since, barring the few times he was absent. During those times people such as Sam Foswell and Clark Kent have looked after the paper. Franklin Stern, an old friend of White's, became the Daily Planet'''s publisher.

The Planet saw its share of rough times during White's tenure. For example, it had many violent worker strikes. The building itself, along with most of the city, was destroyed during the "Fall of Metropolis" storyline; it is only much later that it was restored by the efforts of various superheroes. The Planet building sustained heavy damages after the villain Doomsday's rampage. Later, Franklin Stern decided to put the paper up for sale. Lex Luthor, disliking the heavy criticism of himself and his company that the Planet became noted for, purchased the Daily Planet and subsequently closed the paper down. Luthor fired every employee of the newspaper except for four people: Simone D'Neige, Dirk Armstrong, Jimmy Olsen, and Lois Lane. As a final insult, Luthor saw to it that the Planet globe was unceremoniously dumped in the Metropolis landfill. In the Planets place emerged "LexCom," a news-oriented Internet website that primarily catered to Luthor's views of "quality journalism."

After Lois Lane made a deal with Luthor where, in exchange for him returning the Planet to Perry, she would kill one story of his choosing with no questions asked, Luthor sold the Daily Planet to Perry White for the token sum of one dollar. The paper was quickly reinstated, rehiring all of its old staff. Sometime later, ownership of the Planet fell into the hands of Bruce Wayne, where it has remained ever since. In the Batman: Hush storyline, it is named a subsidiary of Wayne Entertainment.

During the "Y2K" storyline (involving the city of Metropolis being infused with futuristic technology thanks to a descendant of the villain Brainiac), the Daily Planet building was "upgraded" along with the rest of Metropolis, and a holographic globe replaced the physical one. Eventually due to temporal instabilities caused by the B13 Virus, Metropolis and the Daily Planet building, globe and all, were restored to their former states.

In the current comics and media spinoffs, the Daily Planet is presented as a thoroughly modern news operation, including operating an Internet website much like most large newspapers. The Planet's reporters also have access to the best modern equipment to aid their work, though Perry White has often been shown as still favoring his manual typewriter. In 2008, it was said that Clark (at least in this era/continuity) uses a typewriter at his desk due to his powers causing minor interference in regular desktop computers.

During this era, the Planet's major competitors in Metropolis include the tabloid newspaper the Daily Star, WGBS-TV (which also employed Jimmy Olsen and Cat Grant for a time), and Lex Luthor's various media operations. A contemporary publication is Newstime Magazine, where Clark Kent worked as the editor for a time. The publisher of Newstime is Colin Thornton, who is secretly the demon Satanus, an enemy of Superman's.

Superman: Birthright
In the Superman: Birthright limited series, the Daily Planet's publisher was Quentin Galloway, an abrasive overbearing loudmouth who bullied Jimmy Olsen, and later Clark Kent, before being told off by Lois Lane, whom Galloway could not fire because of her star status. This was meant to be a new origin for Superman but one that applied to the Post-Crisis continuity, so later Planet history concerning Luthor temporarily owning it and other events still applied.

Post-Infinite Crisis
During the story Infinite Crisis, parts of the Post-Crisis history were altered. These changes were explained gradually over the next several years. The 2009 mini-series Superman: Secret Origin clarified the earlier history of the Planet in the new continuity. The story established that while Lex Luthor, in the revised history, owns every media in Metropolis and uses it to enforce his public image as a wealthy benefactor, the Planet had always stood free, refusing him ownership and even condemning his actions in editorials signed by Perry White himself. As a result, when Clark Kent is first inducted into the Planet, the newspaper was almost bankrupt, dilapidated and unable to afford new reporters. This changed after Superman begins his career. Thanks to Superman granting exclusive interviews and photographs to Lois Lane and Jimmy Olsen when he debuts, the paper's circulation increased 700%.

General Sam Lane (Lois' father) attempted to capture Superman, seeing him as an alien threat. When he failed to do so, he forcibly shut down the Planet as part of an attempt to force Perry White and Lois to turn over any information they had on Superman that they haven't released to the public. Eventually, Superman turned the public to his favor and Sam Lane was seen in a bad light after his soldier John Corben AKA Metallo ruthlessly endangered civilians. These events lead to the people of Metropolis no longer looking at Lex Luthor as a savior and The Daily Planet becomes the city's top-selling paper, as well as a major player in media.

In Final Crisis #2, the villain Clayface triggers an explosion in The Daily Planet building, greatly damaging the offices, leaving many injured and at least one person dead. Lois Lane is hospitalized. Despite the chaos of Final Crisis and more than half of humanity being enslaved by evil, the newspaper continues to spread news and inform the public via a printing press in Superman's Fortress of Solitude. In Final Crisis #7, it is shown functioning once again.

The New 52

With the reboot of DC's line of comics in 2011, the Daily Planet was shown in the Superman comics as being bought by Morgan Edge and merged with the Galaxy Broadcasting System, similar to the Silver/Bronze Age continuity. In Action Comics, it is revealed that in the new history/universe, Clark Kent begins his journalism career in Metropolis roughly six years before Galaxy Broadcasting merges with the Daily Planet. Along with being a writer for The Daily Star, partly because editor George Taylor was a friend of his adopted parents, Clark is an active blogger who speaks against political corruption and reports on the troubles of everyday citizens who are not often the focus of news media. While working at the Star, Clark meets Planet photographer Jimmy Olsen and the two become friends despite working at rival publications. Clark is also a great fan of Lois Lane's work at the Daily Planet, eventually meeting her through Jimmy. Months after Superman makes his public debut, Clark leaves The Daily Star on good terms and accepts a position at The Daily Planet.

After the merger with Galaxy Broadcasting, Lois was promoted to run the TV division, with Clark acting as an on-the-scene reporter for the TV division. Clark is later assigned the "Superman beat." But after rising tension between himself and Lois, as well as with Galaxy Broadcasting head Morgan Edge, Clark concludes that the Daily Planet is now more concerned with ratings and internet page views than actual journalism. He quits and goes off to begin an independent, internet news site with fellow journalist Cat Grant. Though Lois and Jimmy consider this to be a bad and risky decision, they continue to act as Clark's friends and confidants, offering aid when they can.

At the conclusion of the New 52, following the New 52 Superman's death, Lex Luthor buys the Daily Planet.

30th and 31st Centuries
In virtually every incarnation of the era inhabited by the Legion of Super-Heroes, the Daily Planet is depicted as a fixture in Metropolis, and one of Earth's major media sources. Frequently, the Flash's wife Iris West Allen (a native of the era) is depicted as a member of its staff or editorial board.

Fictional employeesDaily Planet's staff at various times included:
 Clark Kent - Reporter
 Lois Lane - Reporter
 Jimmy Olsen - Photographer and Cub Reporter
 Perry White - Editor-in-Chief
 Lana Lang - Business Columnist and editor
 Cat Grant - Gossip Columnist and editor
 Ron Troupe - Political Columnist and editor
 Steve Lombard - Sports Columnist and editor

In other media

The Daily Planet has been featured in all adaptations of Superman to other media.
From 1976 to 1981, the Daily Planet was a promotional page appearing in regular DC publications (similar to Marvel Comics' Bullpen Bulletins), featuring previews of upcoming publications set in the format of a page from the titular newspaper. Notable features of the page were "The Answer Man", where DC writer/editor Bob Rozakis would answer questions sent in by readers, and a comic strip by cartoonist Fred Hembeck poking fun at DC characters.
A 16-page "Special Invasion Edition" of The Daily Planet was published by DC in November 1988 as a tie-in to the Invasion! crossover event, ostensibly the same edition of the paper shown on the final page of Invasion! #1.

Live-action television
During most of the 1950s television series Adventures of Superman, the Daily Planet exterior was Los Angeles City Hall. In season one, the E. Clem Wilson Building was used for exterior shots of the Planet building.
The Daily Planet in The Adventures of Superpup is named the Daily Bugle, which is not to be confused with the Marvel newspapers also named the Daily Bugle.Lois and Clark: The New Adventures of Superman introduced the idea of a smaller globe above the building's entrance. The rooftop was shown in episode 19 (first season) and indicated that the building has a helipad with no no large globe. At the end of the first season the paper was bought and closed down by Luthor (as would later happen in the comics). Its relaunch was funded by Metropolis businessman Franklin Stern.
 In the 2000s live-action television series Smallville, the Daily Planet building is located across the street from the LuthorCorp building. One of the main characters of Smallville, Chloe Sullivan, worked in the basement of the Planet (seasons 5–7). Her cousin Lois Lane continues to work there, as did Chloe's on again/off again love interest (and eventual husband) Jimmy Olsen until his death at the end of season 8. Clark Kent started to work at the Daily Planet as a copy boy in the show's eighth season, but eventually worked his way up to a reporter in the ninth season. In episode 10 of the sixth season a street sign is shown as Chloe (Allison Mack) runs out of the Daily Planet from Linda Lake (Tori Spelling) and shows that the Planet is located at 355 Burrard St. (which is the actual address of the Marine Building where location filming for the series was shot in Vancouver). Smallville also features the Daily Star as a separate newspaper, which was first seen in "Icarus".
 In the series premiere of Superman & Lois, the Daily Planet is bought out by Morgan Edge, resulting in layoffs which also hit Clark Kent. When Lois Lane's exposé on Edge is turned into a puff piece, she quits in protest. Later episodes show Clark and Lois working at the Daily Planet through flashbacks.

 Animation television 
 In Superman: The Animated Series, in the episode "World's Finest Part 2", it is mentioned that the Daily Planet has offices in Gotham City, when Lois Lane says she is asking for a transfer "to the Planet's Gotham City bureau."
 On the animated series DC Super Hero Girls, the Metropolis High School student newspaper is the Daily Planetoid. A teenage Lois Lane is its editor-in-chief and hopes to secure an internship at the Daily Planet.

Films
In 1978's Superman and its sequels, the Daily Planet exterior was the New York Daily News building. The globe, which used to be on the top of the building, was apparently replaced with one in the lobby as to make room for a helipad on the roof. In fact, The Daily News building in New York has featured a globe in its lobby for almost all of its history. The real-life Daily News was headquartered in The News Building until the mid-1990s.
The 2006 Superman Returns movie has redesigned the Daily Planet as a completely computer generated image of a fictional building inserted into the Empire State Building skyline.
The Daily Planet appears in DC Extended Universe, the Daily Planet exterior was filmed in the Chicago Board of Trade Building. The interior was filmed in the Willis Tower. 
In the 2013 film Man of Steel, the paper's headquarters is located in Metropolis and collapsed during the attack on the city by General Zod's Kryptonian forces. 
The Planet appears again in Batman v Superman: Dawn of Justice (2016), which was rebuilt after the invasion with a new building located next to Parque Heroes. All the events of the invasion and against Superman are published, also about Batman in Gotham City. At the end it talks about the tragic deaths of Superman and Clark Kent, along with the truth about Lex Luthor in the face of his crimes exposed by Lois Lane.
The Planet appears again in Justice League (2017), where Martha Kent and Lois Lane talk about talked about having financial issues with the bank, before they get interrupted by a Daily Planet employee who replaced Lane as a reporter, asked her about source, which Lois lies saying it's a she. The two would talk about Clark, which Martha bring up that Clark said to her one time that Lois was always hungry to find a news story. After the resurrection of Superman and the defeat of Steppenwolf, Lois returns to the Planet where she writes about hope and heroes.
 A Daily Planet newspaper with the headline "Superman is back" appears in Shazam! (2019), where Freddy Freeman shows all his information to Billy Batson.
The Daily Planet appears in Superman: Doomsday.
The Daily Planet appears in Superman Unbound.
In Justice League: War, the Daily Planet building is seen in the background of a fight between Superman, Batman, and Green Lantern.
 A parallel universe version of the Daily Planet renamed PLANETNWZ.COM appears in the 2015 animated film Justice League: Gods and Monsters. PLANETNWZ.COM is a blog and a harsh critic of the Justice League's violent and destructive method.
The Daily Planet globe is destroyed in the 2021 live-action/animated film Space Jam: A New Legacy, during a sequence involving a hijacked subway train. It then causes chaos.
The Daily Planet appears in DC League of Super-Pets.

Video games
 The Daily Planet appears in Superman: Shadow of Apokolips.
 The Daily Planet appears as a stage in Mortal Kombat vs. DC Universe.
 The Daily Planet appears in DC Universe Online. It is located in Downtown Metropolis and has been bottled up by Brainiac.
 The Daily Planet building can be seen off in the distance in Batman Arkham Knight. Additionally, newspapers can be found outside a storage crate that say strange meteors have struck Smallville hinting at the discovery of Kryptonite.
 The Daily Planet appears in Lego Dimensions where it is transported into the Back to the Future world by Lord Vortech.

References

External links
Daily Planet for Pinterest.
 "Superman at the Star": An interview with Superman co-creator Joe Shuster from the Toronto Star, April 26, 1992, about Shuster's memories of Toronto and the Evening Star newspaper.
 The Superman Homepage's entry for the Daily Planet
 Supermanica: Daily Planet Supermanica entry on the Pre-Crisis Daily Planet''

Metropolis (comics)
1940 in comics
Fictional elements introduced in 1940